The Montenegrin Footballer of the Year is an annual award chosen by the team captains and the coaches of the Prva crnogorska fudbalska liga — 1. CFL to determine the best player in Montenegro. It is published by the Football Association of Montenegro. The most successful player is Mirko Vučinić, who has won the award seven times, as well as being the inaugural winner. Stevan Jovetić is the youngest player to receive this honour so far; he was 20 years old when he won the award. The most recent footballer of the year is Stefan Savić for 2021. Before 2006, two Montenegrin footballers were named Yugoslav Footballer of the Year; Dejan Savićević in 1995, and Predrag Mijatović (for three times) in 1992, 1993 and 1998.

Winners

Players

2013 controversy
In 2013, Mirko Vučinić won the Montenegrin Footballer of the Year for the seventh time. However, the public opinion was that in 2013, Dejan Damjanović should have been given the award. Damjanović scored four goals in the 2014 FIFA World Cup qualifiers (two against England and one against Poland and Ukraine), was announced as the top scorer of the K-League and the MVP of the 2013 AFC Champions League. The media agreed that Vučinić was the best overall Montenegrin footballer, however, Damjanović's performances in 2013 were far better than Vučinić's, who was injured during the decisive qualification matches of the national team. Finally, Montenegrin website CG-Fudbal awarded Damjanović "Best Montenegrin Footballer of the Year", according to a poll voted by the fans.

Breakdown of winners

Winners by club nationality

Winners by club

Winners by position

References

External links 
 All Players of the Year at Worldfootball.net
 Mirko Vucinic Player of the Year 2012 Football-Italia.net

Footballers in Montenegro
2006 establishments in Montenegro
Awards established in 2006
Montenegrin awards
Annual events in Montenegro
Association football player non-biographical articles